George Robert Williams (18 November 1932 – March 2003) was an English professional footballer who played as a right half.

Career
Born in Felling, Williams spent his early career with Rotherham United, Sheffield United and Wisbech Town. He signed for Bradford City from Wisbech Town in June 1956. He made 6 league appearances for the club, before moving to Mansfield Town in July 1957.

Sources

References

1932 births
2003 deaths
English footballers
Rotherham United F.C. players
Sheffield United F.C. players
Wisbech Town F.C. players
Bradford City A.F.C. players
Mansfield Town F.C. players
English Football League players
Association football wing halves